Kim Young-nam (born June 15, 1960 in Hampyeong, Jeollanam-do) is a retired South Korean Greco-Roman wrestler and Olympic champion.

Career
Kim was a volleyball player before converting to wrestling in high school. In the 1984 Summer Olympics held in Los Angeles, Kim finished 4th in the welterweight class of Greco-Roman wrestling, losing to 1980 Olympic gold medalist Ștefan Rusu of Romania in the bronze medal match.

Kim received a gold medal at the 1988 Summer Olympics in Seoul.

Kim retired from wrestling after the 1988 Olympics, and participated in the 1996 Summer Olympics as an assistant coach of the South Korean national wrestling team. He has resided in Kazakhstan since 1997, running his own construction company.

References

External links

1960 births
Living people
South Korean wrestlers
Olympic wrestlers of South Korea
Wrestlers at the 1984 Summer Olympics
Wrestlers at the 1988 Summer Olympics
South Korean male sport wrestlers
Olympic gold medalists for South Korea
Olympic medalists in wrestling
Asian Games medalists in wrestling
Wrestlers at the 1986 Asian Games
Medalists at the 1988 Summer Olympics
Asian Games gold medalists for South Korea
Medalists at the 1986 Asian Games
South Korean Buddhists
Sportspeople from South Jeolla Province
20th-century South Korean people
21st-century South Korean people